Eddie Arenas (July 7, 1935 – March 31, 2003) was a Filipino actor. He made numerous films for the film studio Sampaguita Pictures. He was often paired with Lolita Rodriguez, whom he married and later divorced. He eventually moved to the United States and acted only sporadically in Filipino productions. Arenas' last appearance in a film was in 2002 in the movie Mahal Kita: Final Answer!

Filmography

References

External links 

1930 births
Filipino male film actors
2003 deaths